Verneuil is a commune in the Cher department in the Centre-Val de Loire region of France.

Geography

Population

Sights
 The church, dating from the nineteenth century.
 The chateau of Torchefoulon.
 Remains of a fifteenth-century priory.

See also
Communes of the Cher department

References

External links

Annuaire Mairie website 

Communes of Cher (department)